All India Muslim Majlis() is a Muslim political party in India based in Uttar Pradesh.

History
Muslim Majlis was founded by Abdul Jaleel Faridi in 1968, after he had become disillusioned with the Samyukt Vidhayak Dal. In 1977 two Muslim Majlis members were elected to the Uttar Pradesh Legislative Assembly on the Janata Party symbol. Following the death of Faridi the influence of the party declined.

After the death of Faridi, Alhaj Zulfiqarulla became the president and after that Mohd. Qamar Alam Kazmi became the president of All India Muslim Majlis.

In 1992 Qamar Alam Kazmi raised his voice against the demolition of Babri Masjid. He started Karwane Insaf (Nyay Yatra) against the Ram Rath Yatra of Advani. He did several of Dharnas, Morchas etc. in between the period of his presidency.

In 2002 Muslim Majlis joined the Awami Front, but later left it under the presidency of Qamar Alam Kazmi. After Kazmi, Khalid Sabir was elected as president on 18 August 2002.

The youth wing of the party is called All India Youth Majlis. The president of the youth wing is Mohammad Kashif Yunus.

Muslim Majlis later joined Uttar Pradesh United Democratic Front led by ex-minister Janab C.M. Ibrahim and patronised by Shahi Imam Syed Ahmed Bukhari. 
Muslim Majlis fielded Sufi Ubaidurrahman Ansar one of the senior leader of Muslim Majlis as its candidate from Barabanki Constituency in U.P. Other candidates are also contending for assembly election in U.P. under co-ordination of general secretary Nadeem and media co-ordinator Zaid Farooqui.

References

Political parties in Uttar Pradesh
Islamic political parties in India
1968 establishments in Uttar Pradesh
Political parties established in 1968
Islamic organizations established in 1968